Garrha repandula is a moth in the family Oecophoridae. It was described by Zeller in 1855. It is found in Australia, where it has been recorded from South Australia and Tasmania.

References

Moths described in 1855
Garrha